Jonael Angelus Schickler (1976–2002) was a Swiss philosopher who died in a rail crash in England at the age of 25.

Life
Schickler was born in Dornach, Switzerland. His family later moved to Forest Row, East Sussex, and he attended Michael Hall, the Rudolf Steiner school located there. At the age of sixteen he attended Sevenoaks School.

In 1994, he travelled to India and Nepal and on his return, matriculated at Sidney Sussex College, Cambridge, where he read Social and Political Sciences. Soon, however, Schickler decided to change to Philosophy. He graduated with a First and, after a year as a cellist with a Berlin orchestra, Schickler returned to Cambridge (Queens' College, Cambridge) to read for a Doctorate in the Faculty of Divinity, under the supervision of George Pattison. Schickler began supervising undergraduates early in his doctoral career and he was appointed Director of Studies in Philosophy at Hughes Hall, Cambridge in 2001. On 10 May 2002, Schickler was killed in the Potters Bar rail crash.

Philosophical work
At the time of his death, Schickler left behind the completed manuscript of his doctorate as well as the article Death and Life in Modern Thinking, and a large quantity of unpublished material. In November 2004, his thesis was published in German under the title Metaphysik als Christologie, edited by Peter von Ruckteschell and published by Koenigshausen and Neumann. The thesis appeared in English in December 2005, edited by Nick Green and Fraser Watts and published by Ashgate Publishing, under the title Metaphysics as Christology: An Odyssey of the Self from Kant and Hegel to Steiner.

Metaphysics as Christology is part of a larger project in which Schickler was engaged when he died to demonstrate an organic continuity and development between Aristotelian ontology, the 'Kantian turn' and Hegelian dialectic, reaching its fulfilment in the work of Rudolf Steiner. Two other parts of the project exist in complete, albeit unpublished form, From Dialectic to Phenomenology and Aristotle: Man and Metaphysics, and may be published in the future. Other planned parts of the project for which only notes exist are: Phenomenology and Depth Psychology (which was to discuss Nietzsche, Heidegger, Wittgenstein and Jung), Structural Phenomenology (an idea taken from Herbert Witzenmann), and The Recovery of Nature (which included an assessment of the prospects for a rebirth of alchemy).

In Metaphysics as Christology, Schickler examines the key philosophical problems with which Kant and Hegel grappled, and finds in the work of Rudolf Steiner the essence of a solution to them; he claims that Steiner returned to Hegel's philosophical problems but was better able to solve them. Schickler uses these philosophical debates about knowledge and truth to understand the significance of Christ. As theologian Martin Wendte describes, Schickler's "general ontology, according to his philosophical thesis, implies a theological telos, resurrection. In effect, Schickler presents an onto-theo-logy, or, as his title has it: Metaphysics as Christology."

Building on the work of Hegel, Schickler argues that Christ has made possible the developments in human consciousness that restore humanity's relationship to the surrounding world. Fraser Watts contributed the Foreword and George Pattison an extensive Preface.

Watts commented at the time of Schickler's death,

References

External links
 Jonael Schickler in Forschungsstelle Kulturimpuls
 Website of Thomas Schickler
 BBC News report on Potter’s Bar rail crash 2010

1976 births
2002 deaths
People from Dorneck District
Anthroposophists
20th-century Swiss philosophers
People educated at Sevenoaks School
Waldorf school alumni
Railway accident deaths in England
Alumni of Sidney Sussex College, Cambridge
Alumni of Queens' College, Cambridge
Swiss expatriates in the United Kingdom
People from Forest Row